Famagosta is a station on Line 2 of the Milan Metro. It is located on Viale Famagosta. The station was opened on 1 November 1994 as a one-station extension from Romolo. 

South of the station, the line branches off, with trains continuing to either Piazza Abbiategrasso or Assago Milanofiori Forum.

References

Line 2 (Milan Metro) stations
Railway stations opened in 1994